Ivan Noel Dean  (born 21 April 1945) is an Australian politician. He was an independent member of the Tasmanian Legislative Council from 2003 to 2021, representing the electorate of Windermere. He also served as Mayor of Launceston from 2005 to 2007.

Dean studied at Levendale State School, New Town High School and Charles Sturt University. He also received training at the Tasmania Police Academy and the Victoria Police Academy.

Dean worked as a farmer, as an officer in the Australian Army during the Indonesia–Malaysia confrontation, and later as a police officer for Victoria Police, New South Wales Police Force and Tasmania Police, where he rose to the rank of Commander before being elected mayor of Launceston, on 31 October 2005. Dean faced criticism that it was 'irresponsible' to hold two positions in two separate government branches (a member of the legislative council and mayor). He also then receives two salaries. To counter these claims, Ivan Dean said "If successful I will donate the mayoral salary to charities and youth activities.".

In the October Launceston City Council elections; Ivan defeated incumbent Mayor Janie Dickenson. This was somewhat unexpected. On the first day of vote counting, The Examiner local newspaper ran a front-page headline claiming that Janie Dickenson was in front by 2000 votes and would secure her position as mayor and alderman. However, by the next day, Ivan had made a comeback and won by just 441 votes. As other mayoral candidates were excluded, Dean received the bulk of preferences (see single transferable vote).

After becoming mayor, Dean's supporters, including President of the Tasmanian Legislative Council Don Wing, said they believed him capable of holding both positions. Dean praised ex-mayor Janie Dickenson's achievements but acknowledged there was 'much work to be done'. Some in the community praised him as a man that follows up on inquiries. He suggested that councils in the north should consider merging or at least sharing resources more cooperatively but took no action to progress this.

In the legislative council Dean was known for anti tobacco efforts such as his Tobacco Free Generation private member's bill introduced in 2014 that would have prohibited the sale of tobacco products to anyone born after 2000.

Dean created controversy repeatedly claiming that the introduction of red foxes to Tasmania was a hoax, and made a number of allegations against the eradication program resulting in police and Integrity Commission investigations; none of which found any evidence to support his claims. As a police officer, Dean led an investigation into the illegal import of foxes into Tasmania which failed to gain any evidence of the repeated introductions and was criticized for the result.

He was defeated as Launceston mayor at the 2007 council elections, losing to challenger Albert Van Zetten in a surprise result that was attributed, in part, to his ability to hold two public offices and, in part, to Dean's support of a controversial pulp mill. He continued on as a member of the Legislative Council until 2021.

References

External links
Biography

Launceston City Council Website
Ivan Dean

1945 births
Living people
Mayors of Launceston, Tasmania
Members of the Tasmanian Legislative Council
Independent members of the Parliament of Tasmania
Australian police officers
Members of the Order of Australia
Recipients of the Australian Police Medal
Charles Sturt University alumni
Politicians from Hobart
21st-century Australian politicians
Tasmanian local councillors